Ridgeview is an unincorporated community in Peru Township, Miami County, in the U.S. state of Indiana.

It is located within the city limits of Peru.

History
Ridgeview used to be an incorporated town at one point in its history before being annexed to the city of Peru.

Geography

References

Unincorporated communities in Miami County, Indiana
Unincorporated communities in Indiana